Hyalinobatrachium esmeralda is a species of frogs in the family Centrolenidae.

Its natural habitats are cloud forests where it occurs near streams. It is threatened by habitat loss.

References

esmeralda
Amphibians of the Andes
Amphibians of Colombia
Endemic fauna of Colombia
Amphibians described in 1998
Taxonomy articles created by Polbot